Felice Abrami (May 31, 1872 in Milan – August 7, 1919 in Abbiate Guazzone) was an Italian painter active in Milan, depicting mainly landscapes and genre subjects.

Biography
He initially studied a classical education, but later enrolled in the Brera Academy where he studied under Filippo Carcano. In 1910, he participated in an exhibition at the Brera.

References

1872 births
1919 deaths
Italian landscape painters
Brera Academy alumni
19th-century Italian painters
Italian male painters
20th-century Italian painters
Painters from Milan
19th-century Italian male artists
20th-century Italian male artists